D'Isigny was a soft, creamy American cheese, bearing a close resemblance to imported Brie, but made by a process similar to that for Camembert and put up in Camembert shape, though a little larger – about  thick and  across, wrapped in paper and weighing about a pound. It takes its name from Isigny-sur-Mer, in Calvados, Normandy, France, a center of dairy products such as beurre d'Isigny and crème d'Isigny, and itself the origin of the name of Walt Disney, the founder of The Walt Disney Company.

References
 

American cheeses